George Edward Larner (7 February 1875 – 4 March 1949) was an English athlete who competed mainly in the 10-mile walk. He was a multi-time Amateur Athletic Association of England champion, and won two gold medals at the 1908 Summer Olympics in London.

Career
Larner was a Brighton policeman, and took up athletics at the age of 28 in 1903. In 1904 he won the Amateur Athletic Association of England (AAA) titles for the two and seven-mile track walk. He went on to retain these titles in the following year. He wanted to retire as he found training conflicted with his job, but was instead granted an extended leave period by the Police Force. In 1906, he took a two-year break from athletics to train for the upcoming 1908 Summer Olympics held in London. After returning, he was disqualified in his first race in April 1908, at the AAA event in walking over seven miles, but the following July he won the two-mile title.

He competed for Great Britain in the 1908 Summer Games in the 3500 metre walk on 14 July 1908, winning the race ahead of fellow Briton Ernest Webb, who took silver, and New Zealander Harry Kerr. Webb had initially taken the lead, but Larner caught up during the second lap and went on to win the race by over twelve seconds. Afterwards he matched this with another gold medal in the 10-mile walk, this time in a British clean sweep, with Webb again winning silver and Edward Spencer winning bronze. Both he and Webb were inside the world record time, with Larner setting world records for both the 9-mile and the 10-mile distances. His final time was 1 hour, 15 minutes and 57.4 seconds. He was one of ten competitors to win more than a single gold medal at the 1908 Games.

In 1909 he wrote a book on walking entitled Larner's Text Book on Walking: Exercise, Pleasure, Sport. His final AAA success came in 1911, when he won the 7 mile race once more.

Legacy
The record he set for the 2-mile on 14 July 1904 stood for the following 39 years.

The 1908 Summer Games was the only time that either the men's 10-mile walk or the 3500 metre walk took place. This technically means that Larner remains the reigning Olympic champion in both events, and the Olympic record holder. He is one of only a handful of British athletes to have won more than a single gold medal at any one Olympic Games, with only Charlotte Cooper having achieved it at an earlier Olympics, and Henry Taylor winning three medals at the 1908 Games.

Larner's name has been carried on the front of a Scania Omnidekka bus in the fleet of Brighton & Hove since October 2007.

References

1875 births
1949 deaths
British male racewalkers
English male racewalkers
Sportspeople from Slough
English Olympic medallists
Olympic gold medallists for Great Britain
Athletes (track and field) at the 1908 Summer Olympics
Olympic athletes of Great Britain
Medalists at the 1908 Summer Olympics
Olympic gold medalists in athletics (track and field)